Lepotrema acanthochromidis is a species of lepocreadiid digenean parasitic in the intestine of marine fish. It was described in 2018.

Hosts and localities

The spiny chromes, Acanthochromis polyacanthus (Perciformes: Pomacentridae), is the type-host of Lepotrema acanthochromidis. The type-locality is off Heron Island, Great Barrier Reef, Australia, and another locality is off Lizard Island, Great Barrier Reef, Australia.

References 

Plagiorchiida
Animals described in 2018
Platyhelminthes of Australia
Parasites of fish